Simona Rinieri (born 1 September 1977, in Ravenna) is an Italian volleyball player.

She has played for  Italy in the  2000 and 2004 Summer Olympics, and with Italy she won   the gold medal at the 2002 World Championship, held Germany, and 2006 FIVB World Grand Prix.

Family 
In 2006, she married Cuban-Italian volleyball player Ángel Dennis.

References

 Profile
 LegaVolley profile

External links
 
 
 

1977 births
Living people
Sportspeople from Ravenna
Italian women's volleyball players
Volleyball players at the 2000 Summer Olympics
Volleyball players at the 2004 Summer Olympics
Olympic volleyball players of Italy
Mediterranean Games medalists in volleyball
Mediterranean Games gold medalists for Italy
Competitors at the 2009 Mediterranean Games